Helmut Mertens (also known as "Pitt") (11 November 1917 – 17 January 1984) was a German fighter ace of World War II. His victory tally as a fighter pilot is reported as high as ninety-seven or as few as fifty-four aircraft confirmed shot down.

Career
Mertens was born on 11 November 1917 in Essen. By the outbreak of war on 1 September 1939, Mertens had been commissioned as Leutnant and was a fighter pilot flying the Messerschmitt Bf 109 with I. (Jagd) Gruppe of Lehrgeschwader 2 LG 2. With this unit he participated in Operation Case Yellow during the Battle of France and on 19 May 1940, shot down a Royal Air Force Hurricane fighter his first combat victory. On 3 June 1940, he shot down a French Curtiss fighter his second victory. Mertens transferred to Jagdgeschwader 3 flying with their 9 Staffel (squadron) in the Battle of Britain. His unit provided escort cover for German bombers attacking England and on 26 October 1940, he shot down another Hawker Hurricane fighter.

Eastern Front
During Operation Barbarossa, Mertens shot down DB-3 bomber on 26 June 1941, and then during July 1941 he shot down eleven more Soviet aircraft including three in a day on 16 July 1941. He was awarded the Iron Cross 1st Class. On 23 July 1941, Oberleutnant Viktor Bauer, the Staffelkapitän (squadron commander) of 9. Staffel, was injured in a landing accident. In consequence, Mertens was appointed acting commander, a position he held until 6 November. Mertens shot down seven more aircraft in August 1941, one more in September, and another in October 1941.

In February 1942, Mertens transferred to the Staff of Jagdgeschwader 3 and was promoted Oberleutnant before joining the staff of III. Gruppe of Jagdgeschwader 3. He was awarded the German Cross in gold on 27 May 1942, or 8 June 1942. Between 6 April 1942, and 26 July 1942, he shot down fifteen more Russian aircraft, primarily Lavochkin-Gorbunov-Gudkov LaGG-3 and Polikarpov I-153 fighters and Ilyushin DB-3 bombers, bringing his tally to forty confirmed victories.

In late July 1942, Mertens was appointed to command the 1. Staffel (squadron) of Jagdgeschwader 3 and promptly shot down seven more Russian fighters and bombers during the next four weeks. A photograph in Luftwaffe Rudder Markings 1936-45 taken on 22 July 1942, in the Stalingrad sector shows him posing with the tail of his Bf 109 which is marked with forty-seven victory tabs. He was awarded the Knight’s Cross of the Iron Cross on 4 September 1942, the recommendation at the time stated that he had achieved fifty victories in air combat. 

On 2 October, he was temporarily appointed Gruppenkommandeur (group commander) of I. Gruppe of JG 3, replacing Hauptmann Klaus Quaet-Faslem until 2 November 1942. Documentation concerning Mertens service in the next eight or nine months from the time of his award until July 1943 is scarce and no details of his actions as a fighter pilot are known.

Western Front
By July 1943 he was back in action flying with 1 Staffel Jagdgeschwader 3 on the Western Front flying in the Defence of the Reich against the daylight attacks on German home targets primarily by 8th USAAF formations. On 30 July 1943, he shot down a B-17Flying Fortress and on 17 August 1943, another B-17 Flying Fortress.

He was promoted Hauptmann on 1 October 1943, and on 8 January 1944, returned to fully operational duties when he was appointed to command the 7. Staffel of JG 3. On 20 February 1944, Mertens made a ramming attack on a Consolidated B-24 Liberator bomber. In this attack, his Bf 109 G-6 (Werknummer 161358—factory number) crashed near Andernach, he was wounded, and bailed out. He was replaced by Leutnant Erwin Stahlberg as commander of 7. Staffel.

From November 1944 Mertens held posts within  (Training Fighter Wing – East) and finally the operational training establishment of Jagdgeschwader 1.

Summary of career

Aerial victory claims
According to Obermaier, he was credited with about 750 combat missions and 54 confirmed air victories and the sinking of a Russian gun boat. Obermaier records sixty victories in the East and between sixteen on the Western Front, including three four-engined bombers. Spick lists him with 97 aerial victories. Mathews and Foreman, authors of Luftwaffe Aces — Biographies and Victory Claims, researched the German Federal Archives and state that he was credited with at least 49 aerial victories, plus two further unconfirmed claims. This figure of confirmed claims includes at least 45 aerial victories on the Eastern Front and four on the Western Front, including two four-engined bombers.

Awards
 Aviator badge (1938)
 Front Flying Clasp of the Luftwaffe in Gold
 Iron Cross (1939)
 2nd Class (awarded late 1940)
 1st Class (awarded July 1941)
 German Cross in Gold on 27 May 1942 or 27 May 1942 as Oberleutnant in the III./Jagdgeschwader 3.
Knight’s Cross of the Iron Cross on 4 September 1942 as Oberleutnant and pilot in I./Jagdgeschwader 3 "Udet".

Notes

References

Citations

Bibliography

 
 
 
 
 
 
 
 
 
 
 
 
 
 
 

1917 births
1984 deaths
German World War II flying aces
Luftwaffe pilots
Military personnel from Essen
Recipients of the Gold German Cross
Recipients of the Knight's Cross of the Iron Cross